Melitoma taurea, the mallow bee, is a species of chimney bee in the family Apidae. It is found in North America.

References

Further reading

External links

 

Apinae
Insects described in 1837